Buenos Aires me mata  (English language:Buenos Aires Kills Me) is a 1998 Argentine musical film drama directed and written by Beda Docampo Feijóo. The film was premièred on 13 August 1998 in Buenos Aires. The film stars Imanol Arias portraying a drag queen.

Cast
Imanol Arias ....  Condesa Pavlova
Fernán Mirás.........  Laureano
Eleonora Wexler......  Piernitas
Nancy Dupláa.....  Arteche
Claudio Tolcachir....  Gonza
Leonardo Saggese....  Sixto
Maximiliano Ghione
Juan Pablo Ballinou
Silvina Bosco
Marta Betoldi
Julieta Cardinali
Victoria Manno

External links
 

Argentine musical drama films
1998 films
1990s Spanish-language films
Films shot in Buenos Aires
1990s musical drama films
1998 drama films
1990s Argentine films